Baeolidia moebii is a species of sea slug, an aeolid nudibranch, a marine gastropod mollusk in the family Aeolidiidae.

Distribution
This species was described from Mauritius. It has been reported widely in tropical and subtropical waters of the Indo-Pacific Ocean. It is a predator of the sea anemone Cricophorus nutrix.

References

External links
 

Aeolidiidae
Gastropods described in 1888